An anadrome is a word that has its spelling derived by reversing the spelling of another word. It is therefore a special type of anagram. There is a long history of names being coined as ananyms of existing words or names for entities related to the thing named by this subset of anadromes.

Examples

Click on a label to change the sorting.

Many jazz titles were written by reversing names or nouns: Ecaroh inverts the spelling of its composer Horace Silver's Christian name. Miles Davis composed "Nardis" and inverted the spelling of his friend's Ben Sidran's name. Sonny Rollins dedicated to Nigeria a tune called "Airegin".

See also
 -nym
 List of geographic anagrams and ananyms

Notes

References

External links

Word games
Lists of names